Drosera dilatato-petiolaris is a carnivorous plant in the genus Drosera and is endemic to Australia, being found in both Western Australia and the Northern Territory. Green petioles emerging from the center of the rosette are typically 3–5 mm wide, but can vary. Red carnivorous leaves at the end of the petioles are small and round, with most resting on the soil surface. It has a diploid chromosome number of 2n = 12.

Drosera dilatato-petiolaris is found in damp sandy soils on higher ground than Drosera petiolaris is found. It is native to coastal areas near Darwin in the Northern Territory and the northern Kimberley region of Western Australia. It was first recognised and illustrated by Ludwig Diels in his 1906 monograph on the Droseraceae, but was not formally described until 1984 when Katsuhiko Kondo authored three new species in the Drosera petiolaris complex.

See also 
 List of Drosera species
 Taxonomy of Drosera

References

External links 

Carnivorous plants of Australia
Caryophyllales of Australia
Eudicots of Western Australia
Flora of the Northern Territory
Plants described in 1984
dilatato-petiolaris